Letstrack is a GPS tracking and global security service company, based in Gurugram, India. 
 Currently services are offered in India and Sri Lanka, but company plans to expand to UK, US and other countries.

History 
Letstrack was founded in 2015 by Vikram Kumar as an application to monitor employee productivity.

The application grew into an app-to-app tracking system that provided location data and analyzed patterns to help people strategically plan everyday activities and make more efficient use of their time.

In 2017 LetsTrack partnered with Anything Skool to provide child-parent monitoring to 1.5 million students attending school in India.

LetsTrack adapted their app-to-app tracking system for use in the commercial trucking industry allowing its technology to be installed in individual vehicles or company fleets (vans, trucks, cabs). This led to a partnership with United Facilities and Logistics, to provide GPS monitoring for all BMW employees.

LetsTrack received $1.7 million in seed capital from UK based investor: James Arthur (Vikram would later name Arthur COO) In order to improve customer service and sales LetsTrack partnered with retailers across India. In 2019, LetsTrack relocated their offices to Gurgaon India in order to respond to an increasing customer base.

Letstrack is purchasing the raw materials from China and rebranding at Karnal, India.

References 

Software companies established in 2015